Anastasia Zuyeva may refer to:

 Anastasia Zuyeva (swimmer) (born 1990), Russian swimmer
 Anastasia Zuyeva (actress) (1896–1986), Russian actress